Springvalia is a genus of small freshwater snails, aquatic gastropod mollusks in the family Tateidae.

Species
 Springvalia isolata (Ponder & G. A. Clark, 1990)

References

External links
 

Tateidae